John Mathias House, also known as the Mathias Homestead, is a historic home located at Mathias, Hardy County, West Virginia. It consists of two sections, one built about 1797 and the second about 1825.  The two hewn-log sections are joined by a frame "dog trot," or what has been referred to locally as the "entry."  The older section is two stories with a double porch and lightly taller than the newer section.  It was home to the Mathias family for 165 years before being deeded to the Mathias Civic Center Association in 1974.

It was listed on the National Register of Historic Places in 1978.

References

External links

Houses on the National Register of Historic Places in West Virginia
Houses completed in 1797
Houses completed in 1825
Houses in Hardy County, West Virginia
National Register of Historic Places in Hardy County, West Virginia
1797 establishments in Virginia
1825 establishments in Virginia
Log buildings and structures on the National Register of Historic Places in West Virginia